Janssen Pharmaceuticals is a pharmaceutical company headquartered in Beerse, Belgium, and wholly-owned by Johnson & Johnson. It was founded in 1953 by Paul Janssen.

In 1961, Janssen Pharmaceuticals was purchased by New Jersey-based American corporation Johnson & Johnson, and became part of Johnson & Johnson Pharmaceutical Research and Development (J&J PRD), now renamed to Janssen Research and Development (JRD), which conducts research and development activities related to a wide range of human medical disorders, including mental illness, neurological disorders, anesthesia and analgesia, gastrointestinal disorders, fungal infection, HIV/AIDS, allergies and cancer. Janssen and Ortho-McNeil Pharmaceutical have been placed in the Ortho-McNeil-Janssen group within Johnson & Johnson Company.

Subsidiaries

 Actelion
 Cilag AG
 Janssen Biotech (formerly Centocor)
 Janssen Vaccines (formerly Crucell)
 Tibotec

History

The early roots of what would become Janssen Pharmaceuticals date back to 1933. In 1933, Constant Janssen, the father of Paul Janssen, acquired the right to distribute the pharmaceutical products of Richter, a Hungarian pharmaceutical company, for Belgium, the Netherlands and Belgian Congo. On 23 October 1934, he founded the N.V. Produkten Richter in Turnhout. In 1937, Constant Janssen acquired an old factory building in the Statiestraat 78 in Turnhout for his growing company, which he expanded during World War II into a four-story building. Still a student, Paul Janssen assisted in the development of paracetamol (USP: acetaminophen, often referred to generically under the trademark Tylenol) under the name Perdolan, which would later become well-known. After the war, the name for the company products was changed to Eupharma, although the company name Richter would remain until 1956.

Paul Janssen founded his own research laboratory in 1953 on the third floor of the building in the Statiestraat, still within the Richter-Eurpharma company of his father. In 1955, he and his team developed their first drug, Neomeritine (ambucetamide), an antispasmodic found to be particularly effective for the relief of menstrual pain. On 5 April 1956, the name of the company was changed to NV Laboratoria Pharmaceutica C. Janssen (named after Constant Janssen). On 27 April 1957, the company opened a new research facility in Beerse, but the move to Beerse would not be completed until 1971–1972. On 2 May 1958, the research department in Beerse became a separate legal entity, the N.V. Research Laboratorium C. Janssen.

On 25 October 1961, the company was acquired by the American corporation Johnson & Johnson. The negotiations with Johnson & Johnson were led by Frans Van den Bergh, head of the board of directors. On 10 February 1964, the name was changed to Janssen Pharmaceutica N.V. and the seat of the company in Turnhout was also transferred to Beerse. The company was led by Paul Janssen, Bob Stouthuysen and Frans Van Den Bergh. When, in 1971-1972 the pharmaceutical production also moved to Beerse, the move from Turnhout was completed. Between 1990 and 2004, Janssen expanded worldwide, and the company grew in size to about 28,000 employees worldwide.

From the beginning, Janssen emphasized as its core activity research for the development of new drugs. The research department which was established in Beerse in 1957, developed into a large research campus. In 1987, the Janssen Research Foundation (JRF) was founded which performs research into new drugs at Beerse and in other laboratories around the globe. Janssen became the Flemish company with the largest budget for research and development. Beside the headquarters in Beerse with its research departments, pharmaceutical production and the administrative departments, Janssen Pharmaceutica in Belgium still has offices in Berchem (Janssen-Cilag), a chemical factory in Geel, and Janssen Biotech in Olen.

The Chemical Production plant in Geel makes the active ingredients for the company's medicines. In 1975, the first plant of a new chemical factory Plant I was established in Geel, Plant II was opened in 1977, Plant III in 1984, and Plant IV in 1995.  In 1999 the remaining chemical production in Beerse was transferred to Geel. About 80% of its active components are manufactured here. The site in Geel also manufactures about two-thirds of the worldwide chemical production of the pharmaceutical sector of Johnson & Johnson. In 1995, the Center for Molecular Design (CMD) was founded by Paul Janssen and Paul Lewi.

In 1999, clinical research and non-clinical development become a global organization within Johnson & Johnson. In 2001, part of the research activities was transferred to the United States with the reorganization of research activities in the Johnson & Johnson Pharmaceutical Research Development (JJPRD) organization. The research activities of the Janssen Research Foundation (JRF) and the R.W. Johnson Pharmaceutical Research Institute (PRI) (United States) were merged into the new global research organization. A new building for pharmaceutical development was completed in Beerse in 2001. In 2002, a new logistics and informatics centre was opened at a new site, Beerse 2. In 2003 two new research buildings were constructed, the Discovery Research Center (DRC), and the Drug Safety Evaluation Center (DSEC). On 27 October 2004, the Paul Janssen Research Center, for discovery research, was inaugurated.

In 2011, Johnson & Johnson subsidiary Centocor became Janssen Biotech, part of Janssen Pharmaceuticals.

Also in 2011, Johnson & Johnson acquired Crucell, and assigned it to Janssen. The acquisition of Crucell provided Janssen with a disease prevention arm. By 2014, Crucell was renamed as Janssen Vaccines.

In March 2015, Janssen licensed tipifarnib (a farnesyl transferase inhibitor) to Kura Oncology who will assume sole responsibility for developing and commercialising the anti-cancer drug. Later in the same month the company announced that Galapagos Pharma had regained the rights to the anti-inflammatory drug candidate GLPG1690 as well as two other compounds including GLPG1205 (a first-in-class inhibitor of GPR84).

In May 2016, the company launched a collaboration MacroGenics and their preclinical cancer treatment, MGD015. The deal could net MacroGenics more than $740 million.

In September 2017 it was announced that Janssen teamed up with the Biomedical Advanced Research and Development Authority (BARDA), a unit of the U.S. Department of Health and Human Services, to create pandemic flu vaccines. BARDA is giving Janssen $43 million in the first year and $273 million over five years for the contract. One of the projects in the contract is the development of a universal flu vaccine. The intent of the vaccine would be to protect people against all or most flu strains.

On 5 March 2019, the Food and Drug Administration approved Janssen's Spravato (esketamine nasal spray) for treatment-resistant major depressive disorder. This marked the first approval of a new type of antidepressant in decades.

In 2021, Janssen was named as a defendant in a trial against several opioid manufacturers filed by New York Attorney General Letitia Jame. The company was later removed from the case after Johnson & Johnson agreed to a pay a $230 million settlement to New York State.

Janssen Biotech
The subsidiary Janssen Biotech, Inc. was founded in Philadelphia in 1979 as Centocor Biotech, Inc.''', with an initial goal of developing new diagnostic assays using monoclonal antibody technology.

Centocor Biotech
In 1982, Centocor transitioned into a publicly traded company. In the early 1980s, the company moved to Malvern, Pennsylvania. In 1984, Centocor opened an overseas plant in Leiden, the Netherlands.

In 1997, eighteen years after its foundation, Centocor achieved its first year of operating profitability. In 1998, Centocor sold its diagnostic division to Fujirebio, Inc.

In 1999, Centocor became a wholly owned subsidiary of Johnson & Johnson. 

In 2004, Centocor purchased a new manufacturing plant in St. Louis, Missouri, and is currently opening a new manufacturing facility in County Cork, Ireland. The Dutch plant has been expanded substantially with a $250 million investment in additional production facilities, which were opened in 2006.

In 2007, Centocor broke new ground in advertising by releasing Innerstate, believed to be the first theatrically released documentary film both created and entirely funded by a drug company, to promote Remicade (Infliximab).

Centocor Ortho Biotech
In 2008, Centocor, Inc. and Ortho Biotech Inc. merged to form Centocor Ortho Biotech Inc.

In June 2010, Centocor Ortho Biotech acquired RespiVert, a privately held drug discovery company focused on developing small-molecule, inhaled therapies for the treatment of pulmonary diseases.

As Janssen Biotech
In June 2011, Centocor Ortho Biotech changed its name to Janssen Biotech, Inc. as part of a global effort to unite the Janssen Pharmaceutical Companies around the world under a common identity.

In December 2014, the company announced it would co-develop MacroGenics cancer drug candidate (MGD011) which targets both CD19 and CD3 proteins in treating B-cell malignant tumours. This could net MacroGenics up to $700 million.

In January 2015, the company announced it would utilise Ionis Pharmaceuticals' (formerly Isis Pharmaceuticals) Rna-targeting technology to discover and develop antisense drugs targeting autoimmune disorders of the gastrointestinal tract.

In December 2019, XBiotech Inc. announced it would sell its novel antibody treatment (bermekimab) that neutralizes interleukin-1 alpha (IL-1⍺) to Janssen Biotech, Inc.

 COVID-19 vaccine development 

On 27 March 2020, the U.S. Biomedical Advanced Research and Development Authority (BARDA) allocated $456 million for J&J (Janssen) to develop a vaccine against the novel coronavirus.

In China

Janssen Pharmaceuticals was the first Western pharmaceutical company to set up a pharmaceutical factory in the People's Republic of China.

In 1976, Paul Janssen met Ma Haide (born George Shafik Hatem), a Lebanese-American doctor who had started working in China in 1933. After three days of meetings, the two agreed to bring a modernized pharmaceutical business to China.  When Deng Xiaoping opened China to the West in 1978, Janssen sent Paul Appermont and Joos Horsten to set up the project.

In 1983, Janssen signed a cooperation contract to modernize production in an old chemical factory in the city of Hanzhong, in Shaanxi province. This factory would soon produce the active compound of some Janssen products, such as mebendazole. In 1985, now operating as Xian-Janssen Pharmaceuticals, a new large factory was opened in the city of Xi'an, also in Shaanxi province.

Drugs developed

Janssen Pharmaceuticals has developed and brought to the market about 70 new active substances (NCE), of which the most well-known are (name may differ):
 Imodium (against diarrhoea. Active substance: loperamide)
 Motilium (against flatulence and bowel impairments. Active substance: domperidone)
 Reminyl (against Alzheimer's disease (dementia). Active substance: galantamine)
 Daktarin (against fungal infections. Active substance: miconazole)
 Nizoral (against dandruff, Active substance: ketoconazole)
 Duragesic (fentanyl patch for pain suppression. Active substance: fentanyl)
 Vermox (against intestinal worms. Active substance: mebendazole)
 Risperdal (antipsychotic, against mental illness such as schizophrenia. Active substance: risperidone)

WHO Model List of Essential Medicines
Eight original Janssen drugs have been included on the WHO Model List of Essential Medicines:
 Imodium (loperamide)
 Haldol (haloperidol)
 Ergamisol (levamisole)
 Daktarin (miconazole)
 Vermox (mebendazole)
 Nizoral (ketoconazole) (Removed in 2005)
 Risperdal (risperidone)
 Sirturo (bedaquiline) - an diarylquinoline anti-tuberculosis drug, discovered by Koen Andries and his team, which promises a shorter and simpler treatment for multi-drug-resistant tuberculosis (MDR-TB).

Centocor products
In 1984, Centocor developed their first product approved by the U.S. Food and Drug Administration (FDA) — a diagnostic test used to detect the rabies virus.

In 1998, the company launched its top-selling monoclonal antibody Remicade (infliximab) for its first FDA approved indication in Crohn's disease. Subsequently, Remicade's market has expanded with approvals for rheumatoid arthritis, ankylosing spondylitis, psoriatic arthritis, ulcerative colitis, and pediatric Crohn's disease. Remicade was approved for plaque psoriasis in September 2006.

Centocor also markets ReoPro (abciximab), a biologic agent indicated as an adjunct to coronary angioplasty (PTCA).

In 2009, the U.S. FDA approved Simponi, a human monoclonal antibody for treatment for arthritis, which was co-developed with Medarex, Inc.

Risperdal deception
In 2004, the United States Department of Justice began investigating sales practices surrounding the antipsychotic drug risperidone (Risperdal). In 2010, the agency joined a whistleblower suit alleging that despite being warned by the U.S. Food and Drug Administration not to promote Risperdal as effective and safe for elderly patients, in whom it was known to be associated with early death, Johnson & Johnson and Janssen Pharmaceuticals paid pharmacists at Omnicare, the largest supplier of pharmaceuticals to nursing homes, tens of millions of dollars in bribes and kickbacks to promote the drug to physicians for this unapproved use.

The lawsuit resulted in a 2012 provisional settlement totaling $2.3 billion, with Omnicare having already settled for around $100 million. Four states were awarded damages: Louisiana ($258 million in 2010), South Carolina ($327 million in 2011), Texas ($158 million in 2012), and Arkansas ($1.2 billion in 2012).

Former head of sales and president of Janssen Alex Gorsky, who according to the Department of Justice "was actively involved" in the fraud, became CEO of Johnson & Johnson in 2012.

See also

 Janssen-Cilag
 Didier de Chaffoy de Courcelles
 Paul Stoffels
 Staf Van Reet
 Jan Schuurkes
 Tibotec
 Rega Institute for Medical Research
 Drug development
 Nanovid microscopy
 FlandersBio
 Joan Daemen
 Biotech and pharmaceutical companies in the New York metropolitan area
 List of companies of Belgium
 List of pharmaceutical companies

References

Bibliography
 Magiels, Geerdt (2004). Paul Janssen – Pionier in farma en in China'' (in Dutch). Antwerp, Amsterdam:  Houtekiet. .

External links
 Janssen-România
 Janssen Pharmaceutica
 西安杨森制药有限公司 / Xian-Janssen

 
Johnson & Johnson subsidiaries
Pharmaceutical companies of Belgium
Companies based in Antwerp Province
Beerse
Pharmaceutical companies established in 1953
Biotechnology companies established in 1953
1961 mergers and acquisitions
Belgian brands
Belgian companies established in 1953
COVID-19 vaccine producers
Medical research